Bloody Run is a creek tributary to the East Fork Des Moines River. It flows through Humboldt County, Iowa. It enters the East Fork Des Moines north of Humboldt, Iowa.

See also
List of rivers of Iowa

References

Tributaries of the Mississippi River
Rivers of Clayton County, Iowa
Rivers of Iowa